The Cleveland Hills are a range of hills on the north-west edge of the North York Moors in North Yorkshire, England, overlooking Cleveland and Teesside. They lie entirely within the boundaries of the North York Moors National Park. The hills, which rise abruptly from the flat Tees Valley to the north, include distinctive landmarks such as the cone-shaped peak of Roseberry Topping, near the village of Great Ayton – childhood home of Captain James Cook.

Geology 
The hills are formed by multiple stacked layers of Jurassic age sedimentary rocks. The scarp rises above the low ground to the north and west formed by the mudstones of the Redcar Mudstone Formation, though largely buried beneath glacial till from the last ice age. The same formation also provides the lowermost slopes of the scarp. The full sequence, presented in stratigraphic order, i.e. youngest/uppermost at top is:

Ravenscar Group (Middle Jurassic)
Scalby Formation (including the Long Nab and Moor Grit 'members')
Scarborough Formation
Cloughton Formation
Eller Beck Formation
Saltwick Formation
Dogger Formation
Lias Group (early/lower Jurassic)
Whitby Mudstone Formation (including the Mulgrave Shale Member)
Cleveland Ironstone Formation
Staithes Sandstone Formation 
Redcar Mudstone Formation

Most of these formations are various combinations of sandstone, mudstone and siltstone though a couple also contain limestones and the Cleveland Ironstone and Eller Beck formations include ironstone, the former having been exploited for the ironworking industry in former times. The plateau surface is largely formed by the sandstones of the Saltwick and Cloughton formations whilst the summit of Roseberry Topping is an outlier of the Saltwick Formation separated from the main Cleveland Hills range by erosion.

The Cleveland Dyke cuts through the hills forming the Langbaurgh Ridge and Cliff Ridge just south of Roseberry Topping where Cliff Rigg Quarry has exploited this Palaeogene age basaltic andesite intrusion for use as roadstone.

Glaciofluvial deposits are scattered around the margins of the hills, notably in Kildale whilst peat has accumulated on the plateau surface in some areas. Landslips are common in the Lias Group rocks along the scarp face in the west and in Raisdale to the south.

History

Early man 
There are a number of tumuli and stone circles scattered throughout the Cleveland Hills and North York Moors, dating back to the Bronze Age, as well as many cairns that are of varied ages, some of which are relatively modern. Hundreds of flint arrowheads have been discovered during excavations in the hills and dated to the Mesolithic and Neolithic periods, indication of an active population in prehistoric times across the region.

Stone circles in the Cleveland Hills 
 Commondale
 Tripsdale "Bride Stones"
 Thimbleby "Nine Stones"

Mining and industry 

In 1850 ironstone was discovered by John Marley of Bolckow and Vaughan in the Eston Hills, outliers of the Cleveland Hills, leading to mining on a large scale and the rapid growth of nearby Middlesbrough. By the 1870s industry would be producing steel in vast amounts, and mining for coal, alum, jet, cement stone concretions, shale and potash from the hills, as well as employing sandstone and limestone quarries to gather raw materials. Many of the mines and quarries are still evident today.

Hill data 
The following heights are some of the highest or most notable in the range.

Towns and villages in the Cleveland Hills 

There are numerous towns and villages on, or in the vicinity of, the Cleveland Hills including the following:

Interesting places to see
 Captain Cook Birthplace Museum, Marton, Middlesbrough 
 Captain Cook Monument, Easby Moor
 Captain Cook Schoolroom Museum, Great Ayton
 Roseberry Topping
 Wainstones, Hasty Bank

The digital switchover at Bilsdale was completed in two stages, on 12 and 26 September 2012, one of the last transmitters in England to complete this operation, the others being Pontop Pike and Chatton in the same region.

See also 
 List of Sites of Special Scientific Interest in Cleveland
 List of Sites of Special Scientific Interest in North Yorkshire

References

External links 
 North York Moors National Park
 North York Moors and Cleveland Hills

Mountains and hills of North Yorkshire
Redcar and Cleveland
North York Moors